is a railway station in the city of Fukushima, Fukushima Prefecture, Japan operated by the East Japan Railway Company (JR East). It is also a freight depot for the Japan Freight Railway Company (JR Freight)

Lines
Matsukawa Station is served by the Tōhoku Main Line, and is located 259.5 rail kilometers from the official starting point of the line at Tokyo Station.

Station layout
The station has one island platform and one side platform connected to the station building by a footbridge. The station is staffed.

Platforms

History
The Kawamata Line, running between Matsukawa and Iwaki-Kawamata operated from this station from March 1, 1926 to May 14, 1972.The Matsukawa derailment, an alleged sabotage that resulted in the derailment of a train, occurred near the station on August 17, 1949. The station was absorbed into the JR East network upon the privatization of the Japanese National Railways (JNR) on April 1, 1987.

Passenger statistics
In fiscal 2018, the station was used by an average of 1119 passengers daily (boarding passengers only).

Surrounding area
Matsukawa Post Office
Toshiba Electric factories

See also
 List of Railway Stations in Japan

References

External links

   

Stations of East Japan Railway Company
Stations of Japan Freight Railway Company
Railway stations in Fukushima Prefecture
Tōhoku Main Line
Railway stations in Japan opened in 1887
Fukushima (city)